Josip "Joža" Horvat (10 March 1915 – 26 October 2012) was a Croatian writer. He was the author of many novels, short stories, dramas, screenplays, essays and radio dramas, translated into at least nine languages, including Russian, Chinese and Esperanto.

Life and career 

Horvat was born in Kotoriba, Međimurje, northern Croatia, at the time in Zala County in Hungary.
During World War II he fought in Yugoslav Partisans, which later inspired the  novel Mačak pod šljemom (Tomcat under a Helmet, 1962) which had a somewhat ironical view of the partisan movement, adapted both into a feature film and a miniseries.  The screenplay Ciguli Miguli (1952), critical of bureaucracy, briefly brought him into disfavour with the Communist party authorities, on which occasion he turned to sailing.

In mid-1960s Horvat and his family sailed the world in the sailing yacht Besa, and his travel journal Besa–brodski dnevnik (Besa–Ship's Log, 1973) became a best-seller.  The second trip around the world was marked by tragedy: Horvat’s older son, who stayed back, died in a traffic accident in 1973, and his younger son drowned in Venezuela in 1975.

After a period of deep crisis Horvat published two acclaimed novels inspired by these events, Operacija "Stonoga" (Operation "Centipede", 1982), about a search for a lost island in the Atlantic, and Waitapu (1984), about a Pacific Islander boy who decides to sail across a taboo line. His last work is a memoir titled Svjedok prolaznosti (A Witness to Impermanence, 2005).

Horvat attended the Faculty of Philosophy in Zagreb and served as a secretary of Matica hrvatska.

References

1915 births
2012 deaths
Yugoslav writers
Croatian screenwriters
Yugoslav Partisans members
Faculty of Humanities and Social Sciences, University of Zagreb alumni
Vladimir Nazor Award winners
People from Kotoriba